Heros is a genus of cichlids native to the Amazon, Orinoco and Essequibo River basins in South America. They were previously included in the genus Cichlasoma before its restriction to the distinct group of "Port Cichlids."

The Heros species most commonly encountered in the aquarium trade are fish referable to the species Heros efasciatus. However, the trade name generally used is "Severum Cichlids." Trade fish are very often line bred specimens of color sports such as "Super Red Severums" or "Gold Severums." The provenance of these is not clear, but they seem to have been derived from the base "Green Severum" form that is most closely identified with H. efasciatus.

Species
There are currently five recognized species in this genus:
 Heros efasciatus Heckel, 1840
 Heros liberifer Staeck & I. Schindler, 2015
 Heros notatus (Jardine, 1843)
 Heros severus Heckel, 1840
 Heros spurius Heckel, 1840

Many authorities also cite a previously described species, Heros appendiculatus. It has a form quite distinct from H. efasciatus but was synonymized with H. efasciatus by Dr. Sven O. Kullander. Another color form, Heros sp. Rotkeil ("Red Shoulder") is thought by hobby specialists to represent an undescribed Heros species.

References

 
Heroini
Cichlid genera
Taxa named by Johann Jakob Heckel